Karl Moser (August 10, 1860 – February 28, 1936) was an architect from Switzerland.  

Between 1887 and 1915 he worked together with Robert Curjel in Karlsruhe, setting up the architecture firm Curjel and Moser. Some of their works are:
 Kunsthaus Zurich
 University of Zurich
 Basel Badischer Bahnhof
 St. Paul's Church, Bern
 St. Anthony's (Antoniuskirche), Basel
 several Protestant churches

From 1915 to 1928 he was professor at ETH Zurich.

In 1928 he was president of the newly founded Congrès International d'Architecture Moderne, an organisation, steered prominently by the pioneers of modernism, architects Le Corbusier and Walter Gropius, which championed rational and functionalist architecture, while critiquing the type of revivalist architecture typified by Moser's own work. Indeed, at was at this time that Moser's own work changed radically towards modernism, exemplified in the St. Anthony's (Antoniuskirche) in Basel (1925-27), built in reinforced concrete rather than brick and stone typical for his earlier works.

His son Werner M. Moser also became a notable architect.

References
Leonardo Benevolo. History of Modern Architecture, Volume 2. MIT Press, 1977 pg. 618

1860 births
1936 deaths
Swiss architects
Congrès International d'Architecture Moderne members
ETH Zurich alumni
Academic staff of ETH Zurich